Chullpa Urqu (Quechua chullpa stone tomb, burial tower, urqu mountain, "chullpa mountain", also spelled Chullpa Orkho) is a mountain in the Bolivian Andes which reaches a height of approximately . It is located in the Chuquisaca Department, Oropeza Province, Yotala Municipality.

References 

Mountains of Chuquisaca Department